Fabián Andrés Bastidas (born October 6, 1993) is an American-Colombian professional footballer.

Early life
Fabián Andrés Bastidas was born on October 6, 1993 in Brooklyn, New York to Colombian parents. In his youth, he briefly moved to Cali, Colombia before his family returned to the United States to live in Hollywood, Florida. He attended Hollywood Hills High School, and was a standout athlete on the school's soccer team, setting a record of 28 goals scored in his junior year. He also played for local clubs Hollywood Wildcats and South Florida Elite. At age 15, Bastidas trained with Danubio F.C. in Uruguay over several summers and once trained with West Ham United of England. However, he was unable to sign with either club as a foreign minor not living with his parents.

Club career
Upon turning 18 and becoming eligible to play competitively abroad, Bastidas signed with C.A. Bella Vista in Uruguay. He made no appearances for them in the 18 months he was signed before the club hit a financial crisis leading to his departure.

In 2013 he signed with River Plate in the Uruguayan Primera División. He made his professional debut during the 2014–15 season.

On January 23, 2019, Tulsa Roughnecks named Bastidas as one of three new signings ahead of their 2019 season. Following a match between OKC Energy and Tulsa Roughnecks on April 27, 2019, OKC defender Atiba Harris wrote in a tweet that a Roughnecks player had twice used the N-word against him. The following day, Tulsa terminated Bastidas' contract and released him from the team for "his use of foul and abusive language during last night's match." Bastidas admitted to using the word but claimed it was only intended as slang, writing in an Instagram post, "In South America, New York, Portugal, and everywhere else I've lived, we say it with love." The Athletic reported that the USL disciplinary committee will announce a 5-match ban for Bastidas if he signs with another USL club, the longest ban for foul language in league history.

On July 9, 2020, FC Tulsa re-signed Bastidas.

References

1993 births
Living people
Uruguayan footballers
C.A. Bella Vista players
Club Atlético River Plate (Montevideo) players
FC Tulsa players
Association football midfielders
Soccer players from New York (state)
USL Championship players
Soccer players from Florida
Sportspeople from Hollywood, Florida
American sportspeople of Colombian descent
American expatriate sportspeople in Uruguay
Expatriate footballers in Uruguay
American expatriate soccer players
Expatriate footballers in Portugal
American expatriate sportspeople in Portugal